The Science, Innovation and Environment Select Committee (Malay: Jawatankuasa Pilihan Khas Sains, Inovasi dan Alam Sekitar; ; Tamil: மலேசிய அறிவியல், கண்டுபிடிப்பு மற்றும் சுற்றுச்சூழல் பணிக்குழு) is one of many select committees of the Malaysian House of Representatives, which scrutinises the Ministry of Energy, Science, Technology, Environment and Climate Change. It is among four new bipartisan parliamentary select committees announced by the Minister in the Prime Minister's Department in charge of legal affairs, Liew Vui Keong, on 17 October 2019 in an effort to improve the institutional system.

Membership

14th Parliament 
As of December 2019, the Committee's current members are as follows:

Chair of the Science, Innovation and Environment Select Committee

See also
 Parliamentary Committees of Malaysia

References 

Parliament of Malaysia
Committees of the Parliament of Malaysia
Committees of the Dewan Rakyat